Brassicogethes is a genus of pollen beetles in the family Nitidulidae. There are at least 4 described species in Brassicogethes.

Species
 Brassicogethes aeneus (Fabricius, 1775) (common pollen beetle)
 Brassicogethes cleominis (Easton, 1959)
 Brassicogethes simplipes (Easton, 1947)
 Brassicogethes viridescens (Fabricius, 1787)

References

 Audisio, P., A. R. Cline, A. De Biase, G. Antonini, E. Mancini, M. Trizzino, L. Costantini, et al. (2009). "Preliminary re-examination of genus-level taxonomy of the pollen beetle subfamily Meligethinae (Coleoptera: Nitidulidae)". Acta Entomologica Musei Nationalis Pragae, vol. 49, no. 2, 341–504.

Further reading

 Arnett, R.H. Jr., M. C. Thomas, P. E. Skelley and J. H. Frank. (eds.). (2002). American Beetles, Volume II: Polyphaga: Scarabaeoidea through Curculionoidea. CRC Press LLC, Boca Raton, FL.
 Arnett, Ross H. (2000). American Insects: A Handbook of the Insects of America North of Mexico. CRC Press.
 Richard E. White. (1983). Peterson Field Guides: Beetles. Houghton Mifflin Company.

Nitidulidae
Cucujoidea genera